The group stage of the 2013–14 Indian Federation Cup was played from 14 January to 21 January 2014. A total of sixteen teams competed in the group stage.

Group A

Group B

Group C

Group D

References

Group